The 59 Club, also written as The Fifty Nine Club and known as 'the 9', is a British motorcycle club with members distributed internationally.

The 59 Club started as a Church of England-based youth club founded at St Mary of Eton church in Hackney Wick by Reverend John Oates, in the East End of London, then an underprivileged area suffering post-war deprivations. The club was established to provide a place where young people could meet together and enjoy music and fellowship. It broke with the tradition of most church youth clubs at the time by allowing entry to all young people from the local community whether they attended church or not. Oates managed to persuade teen star, Cliff Richard to play at the Club's opening night on Thursday 2 April 1959, guaranteeing a huge turnout of young people and making the club an instant success.

In 1962 a motorcycle section was established, meeting once a week on Saturday evenings at the Eton Mission where there was ample parking and a large hall with table tennis, billiards, a juke box and a coffee bar. Motor Cycle staff writer Mike Evans in 1963 reported: "Ably managed by the Rev. Bill Shergold, the club is affectionately known by London riders as 'The Vic's Caff'!"

It was notable, initially in the London area during the mid-1960s, for its adoption by the British motorcycling subculture known as 'rockers', who were at that time seen as "folk devils" at the centre of a moral panic in society. Its badge has taken on an iconic value for them.

History

It was started by Church of England curate John Oates, who went on to become the Canon of St. Brides in Fleet Street. Rev William Shergold started the motorcycle section in 1962 after a visit to the Ace Cafe, and it was later run by Rev Graham Hullet and Mike Cook. The club became an instant success after John Oates secured teen star Cliff Richard to play at its opening night on the 2nd of April, 1959. Sir Cliff Richard returned often to the club over subsequent years, and it attracted Princess Margaret, her husband Lord Snowdon, actor Dame Elizabeth Taylor and later many motorcycling sportsmen and musicians. Its trustees included Bishop Trevor Huddleston, the famous anti-apartheid campaigner. For British motorcyclists, it was famous for being one of the first places in the UK to preview the previously banned biker movie The Wild One, in 1968.

From 1962 to the early 1980s, the club enjoyed fame as the top hang-out spot for London rockers and motorcyclists, and overall it created a positive archetype for the young members to follow, in the bad boys made good vein. At the time, some rockers were considered folk devils, due to their clashes with scooter-riding mods (see Mods and Rockers).

In May 1964 the club moved from Hackney Wick to a church property at Paddington Green when Rev. Shergold moved to a new parish of St Mary on Paddington Green Church St Mary's in Paddington in the West End of London.

In March 1965, AP news agency quoted the membership as "nearly 7,000, from almost every corner of Britain". The club celebrated its third birthday at a function held at their two-storey church hall on 23 October, with a large iced cake weighing  created by Arthur Keen and decorated by 'Jiminy' as a facsimile of Brands Hatch motor racing circuit. The hall was packed with 1,200 members and friends attended with some sleeping overnight and near to 1,000 motorcycles parked outside. At that time, Motor Cycle magazine quoted the membership at 10,000, further confirming the previous year's membership with the comment: "That's well over 250 new members a month, if you care to work it out!". The celebrations were concluded the next day, Sunday, when Rev. Shergold held a service at his nearby church.

The January 1966 issue of Motorcycle Mechanics magazine carried a letter submitted previously by a Charles Howe, on behalf of the 59 Club, successfully applying for a free motorcycle, a vintage 1939 Royal Enfield v-twin donated by Assistant Editor Ian Speller, when the membership was quoted at 9,500.

The venue for the next function, the club's fourth birthday, was Alexandra Palace, allowing for 3,000 attendees on 10 December. The membership in September 1966 was quoted at 13,000, with a stand at the Earls Court motorcycle show to recruit further new members.

In 1969 the club was quoted as having 20,000 members on the occasion of a "Write-In" on 5 October, where members were being sent letters by mail and encouraged to contribute 1 pound (£) each, to raise capital needed to renovate their new premises.

The 59 Club attracted both male and female members and, according to Father Graham Hullet its success was based on its almost entire lack of rules. 
Besides motorcycles and 1950s rock and roll, the club involved activities such as football and sub-aqua diving—which gave the youths, mainly from underprivileged backgrounds, an outlet for their energy. Each year, the club organised ride-outs to famous winter motorcycle rallies such as the Dragon Rally in Wales, the Elephant Rally at the Nürburgring in Germany, and to the Isle of Man TT races. The 59 Club Barbeque still occurs every year at TT in Laxey, on the Isle of Man coast.

Towards the end of its heyday, the club witnessed the birth of a very different type of motorcycle club—American-style outlaw motorcycle clubs, the rise of these groups, which tended to cater to an older, tougher crowd, was a contrast to the 59 way of life marking the end of the 1960s British Rocker sub-culture.

This was followed by a period when Japanese motorcycles outnumber the old British irons, The subculture would not see a resurgence for almost a decade, but the legend of the 59 Club carried on with original members who were determined to keep the spirit of the 1950s alive with the ageing Ton-Up/Rocker scene.

The Club relied on a new breed of modern Rockers on their newer bikes through the '80s and was very popular at its headquarters in Hackney Yorkton St. It has always carried its Rocker roots, with rock and roll still on the Jukebox as it is today.

By the late 1980s, a Rockers revival was underway and a number of enthusiasts started a 'Classic Section' within the club, a sub-group of members dedicated to upholding the 1960s rockers subculture (the style, music, and motorcycles), this again died away until recently, but the 59 has never stopped attracting a mixed motorcycling membership many of whom are Rockers.

Past leaders
 Rev Bill Shergold, remembered as being like "a father figure that many of the boys never had", was the president until he died aged 89 in Wells, Somerset in May 2009.

Another vicar, Rev. Graham Hullett, a keen motorcyclist, was Club Leader running the club from 1966 to 1970, developing an ideology that helped people from troubled backgrounds. He was interviewed for BBC Radio 4 Home Truths, when he spoke of the club's heyday. Hullet died in a Lincoln hospital in 2012, aged 80.

Mike Cook, who was a paid youth leader, retired from the club in 1992.

Present day

In 1993 the 59 Club moved from Yorkton Street in Hackney to Plaistow. Up until that time all the club heads were paid either by the church or the GLC but since then have managed the club on a voluntary basis.

In September 2009, the club celebrated its 50th anniversary service at St Martin-in-the-Fields church, Trafalgar Square, London.

In June 2018, the 59 Club appointed a new vicar, Father Sergiy Diduk, who opened a West London branch on the last Thursday of the month at All Saints Church in Hanworth, the first church set up by 59 Club founder Father Bill Shergold.

2019 - The 60th anniversary of the club. The Bishop of London approached the club to offer the use of St. Pauls Cathedral to celebrate its diamond jubilee, with runs converging across London on the cathedral for a mass blessing and a remembrance.

References

Further reading
 Cook, Mike Cowboy's Fifty Nine Club Story

External links
 
 Father Graham Hullett on BBC Home Truths
 

Church of England societies and organisations
Motorcycle clubs in the United Kingdom
Youth culture in the United Kingdom
West Ham